This article lists political parties in Portugal. 
The Portuguese political scene has been dominated by the Socialist Party and the Social Democratic Party since the 1974 Carnation Revolution, although the CDS – People's Party has been present in some governments and the Portuguese Communist Party in coalition with The Greens holds the presidency of several municipalities.

The parties, as of 2022, represented in the Assembly of the Republic are the Socialist Party (120 MPs), the Social Democratic Party (77 MPs), the ENOUGH (12 MPs), the Liberal Initiative (8 MPs), the Communist Party (6 MPs), the Left Bloc (5 MPs), the FREE party (1 MP), and the People-Animals-Nature party (1 MP). Several other parties are represented in the legislatures of the autonomous regions, the Legislative Assembly of the Azores and the Legislative Assembly of Madeira.

General overview

This list presents all the existing parties recognized by the Portuguese Constitutional Court.

 The Socialist Party (PS), a social democratic party, is a major party in Portugal, resembling the British Labour Party, the German SPD or the Spanish PSOE. The party was founded before the 1974 Revolution in Bad Münstereifel, West Germany, by (among others) Mário Soares, its historical leader and one of the main opponents of the dictatorial regime. Its leader, António Costa, is the current Prime Minister of Portugal and the current Secretary-General of the United Nations António Guterres is a former leader and Prime Minister.
 The Social Democratic Party (PPD/PSD), despite the name, is not a traditional social democratic party, being much closer to the centre-right. A major party, particularly strong in the interior North and Center regions, it is a big tent party and the equivalent of any other liberal conservative party in Europe such as the French Republicans or the German CDU. The PSD was founded right after the 1974 Revolution as Partido Popular Democrático (Democratic People's Party) by many personalities of the so-called "liberal wing" of the fascist regime, like Francisco Sá Carneiro (the PSD historical leader) and Francisco Pinto Balsemão. The current President of Portugal, Marcelo Rebelo de Sousa, is a former leader.
 The Left Bloc (BE), formed as a result of the merger of three left-wing parties (the Popular Democratic Union, the Revolutionary Socialist Party, and the Politics XXI), is an overwhelmingly urban party, adopting a wide range of left-wing policies and portrays itself as the modern, progressive alternative to the Portuguese Communist Party.
 The Portuguese Communist Party (PCP), founded in 1921 as the Portuguese Section of the Communist International, has its major influence among the working class and played a major role in the opposition to the Estado Novo regime, being brutally repressed in the process. After being one of the most influential parties in the years that followed the Carnation Revolution, it lost most of its power base after the fall of the Eastern Bloc, but still enjoys popularity in vast sectors of Portuguese society, particularly in the rural areas of Alentejo and Ribatejo and also in the heavily industrialized areas around Lisbon and Setúbal. It also has a major influence among the biggest Portuguese labour union – General Confederation of the Portuguese Workers (CGTP). Its historical leader was Álvaro Cunhal.
 The CDS – People's Party (CDS–PP) is a traditional Christian Democrat and conservative party, similar to the German CSU or the Spanish PP. Founded after the revolution, its historical leaders were Diogo Freitas do Amaral and Adelino Amaro da Costa. In 1976 it was the only party that voted against approval of a socialist constitution. Later, it was part of several governments in coalition with the PSD. The CDS congregates several right-wing tendencies ranging from christian democrats to neoliberals and more conservative elements.
 The People-Animals-Nature (PAN) is a party inspired by environmentalism and strongly focused on the rights of animals and animal welfare and which considers itself to be socially progressive, defending LGBT rights and women's rights.
 The Ecologist Party "The Greens" (PEV) is the first Portuguese green party, it is traditionally allied with the Communist Party in the Unitary Democratic Coalition.
 The ENOUGH (CH) is a Portuguese nationalist and right-wing populist party founded by PSD dissident André Ventura, similar to the French National Rally, the Spanish Vox or the Italian Lega Nord. Like them, it is a socially conservative party which also opposes immigration, multiculturalism and the European Union.
 The Liberal Initiative (IL) is a classically liberal and right-libertarian party. 
 The FREE (L) is an eco-socialist, pro-European party.
 The Alliance (A) is a party formed by former Social Democratic leader and former Prime Minister Pedro Santana Lopes.
 The Portuguese Workers' Communist Party (PCTP/MRPP) is a Maoist and formerly pro-Chinese party. It had a high-profile during the Carnation Revolution, mostly due to its influence among some groups of students, although it never reached 2% of the votes or elected a single MP.
 The React, Include, Recycle (RIR) is a humanist, pacifist and universalist party ("Rir" in Portuguese means "laughing").
 The Rise Up! (E) is a far-right nationalist party with little political expression. 
 The Earth Party (MPT) is a centre-right green conservative party, founded in 1993 by a faction of the People's Monarchist Party.
 The We, the Citizens! (NC) is a minor centre-right party founded as a result of the anti-austerity movement.
 The National Democratic Alternative (ADN) was founded by the former leader of the Portuguese Bar Association, António Marinho e Pinto. He ran as the Earth Party candidate for the 2014 European elections but left the party soon after to form his own party. A populist party, defends a reform of the electoral system and reform of justice system.
 The United Party of Retirees and Pensioners (PURP) is a small party with the goal to defend the rights of retirees and pensioners, aiming to position itself as the political voice of the members of this age group. It was founded as a result of the anti-austerity movement.
 The Together for the People (JPP) was formed as an independent movement for the local elections of 2013 in the municipally of Santa Cruz in Madeira. Transformed into a political party in 2015 in order to contest the regional elections in Madeira.
 The People's Monarchist Party (PPM) is a small monarchist party with little political expression. It is known that the pretender heir to the Portuguese throne, Duarte Pio, Duke of Braganza, does not support this party, since the question of monarchical regime is considered to be above partisanship.
 The Portuguese Labour Party (PTP) is a minor party of the centre-left.
 The Socialist Alternative Movement (MAS) was formed in 2000 as a Portuguese Trotskyist political organization and it is the result of a merger between the Left Revolutionary Front (FER - Frente da Esquerda Revolucionária), and the young activists of the student movement Ruptura. The Ruptura/FER activists integrated the Left Bloc since its formation. In 2011, the movement split from the Left Bloc and formed a new party called Socialist Alternative Movement that was approved by the Constitutional Court in July 2013.
 The Volt Portugal (VP), portuguese chapter of Volt Europa, is a pro-European and European federalist political movement. The organisation follows a "pan-European approach" in many policy fields such as climate change, migration, economic inequality, international conflict, terrorism and the impact of the technological revolution on the labour market. It identifies itself as a pan-European, progressive, social-liberal and environmentalist political party.

National political parties

Parties represented in the Assembly of the Republic and/or the European Parliament

Parties without representation in the Assembly of the Republic or the European Parliament

Extinct parties
This list presents the parties and coalitions of the current Third Republic that were once recognized by the Portuguese Constitutional Court but ceased to exist. It is organized by political spectrum and alphabetical order (in Portuguese).

Far-left
Worker-Peasant Alliance - AOC (Aliança Operário-Camponesa)
Portuguese Marxist–Leninist Committee - CM-LP (Comité Marxista-Leninista Português)
Marxist–Leninist Committee of Portugal - CMLP (Comité Marxista-Leninista de Portugal)
Communist Electoral Front (Marxist-Leninist) - FEC(ML) (Frente Eleitoral Comunista (Marxista–Leninista))
Left Revolutionary Front - FER (Frente de Esquerda Revolucionária)
Popular Unity Force - FUP (Força de Unidade Popular)
Internationalist Communist League - LCI (Liga Comunista Internacionalista)
Portuguese Marxist-Leninist Communist Organization - OCMLP (Organização Comunista Marxista Leninista Portuguesa)
Workers Politics Communist Organisation - OCPO (Organização Comunista Política Operária)
Organization for the Reconstruction of the Communist Party (Marxist–Leninist) - ORPC(ML) (Organização para a Reconstrução do Partido Comunista (Marxista-Leninista))
Communist Party of Portugal (Marxist-Leninist) - PCP(ML) (Partido Comunista de Portugal (Marxista-Leninista))
Communist Party (Reconstructed) - PC(R) (Partido Comunista (Reconstruído))
Workers' Party of Socialist Unity - POUS (Partido Operário de Unidade Socialista)
Revolutionary Party of the Proletariat – Revolutionary Brigades - PRP-BR (Partido Revolucionário do Proletariado - Brigadas Revolucionárias)
Workers' Revolutionary Party - PRT (Partido Revolucionário dos Trabalhadores)
Workers' Socialist Party - PST (Partido Socialista dos Trabalhadores)
Labour Party - PT (Partido Trabalhista, not to be confused with the Portuguese Labour Party - PTP) 
Popular Unity Party - PUP (Partido de Unidade Popular)
Communist Union for the Reconstruction of the Party (Marxist–Leninist) - UCRP(ML) (União Comunista para a Reconstituição do Partido (Marxista-Leninista))

Left-wing to far-left
United People Alliance - APU (Aliança Povo Unido)
Electoral Front United People - FEPU (Frente Eleitoral Povo Unido)

Left-wing
People's Socialist Front - FSP (Frente Socialista Popular)
Popular Unity Dynamization Groups - GDUPs (Grupos Dinamizadores da Unidade Popular)
Socialist League of the Workers - LST (Liga Socialista dos Trabalhadores)
Portuguese Democratic Movement - MDP (Movimento Democrático Português)
Movement of Socialist Left - MES (Movimento de Esquerda Socialista)
Revolutionary Socialist Party - PSR (Partido Socialista Revolucionário)
Popular Democratic Union - UDP (União Democrática Popular)
Politics XXI - PXXI (Política XXI)
Left-wing Union for the Socialist Democracy - UEDS (União da Esquerda para a Democracia Socialista)

Centre-left
Independent Social Democratic Association - ASDI (Acção Social Democrata Independente)
Democratic Center of Macau - CDM (Centro Democrático de Macau)
Republican and Socialist Front - FRS (Frente Republicana e Socialista)
Party of the Folk - PG (Partido da Gente)
Humanist Party - PH (Partido Humanista)
Democratic Renewal Party - PRD (Partido Renovador Democrático)
Portuguese Democratic Labour Party - PTDP (Partido Trabalhista Democrático Português)

Centre
Movement for the Sick - MD (Movimento pelo Doente)
Hope for Portugal Movement - MEP (Movimento Esperança Portugal)
National Solidarity Party - PSN (Partido da Solidariedade Nacional)
Liberal Democratic Party - PLD (Partido Liberal Democrata)

Centre-right
Democratic Alliance - AD (Aliança Democrática)
Association for the Defense of the Interests of Macau - ADIM (Associação para a Defesa dos Interesses de Macau)
New Democracy Party - PND (Partido da Nova Democracia)
Portuguese Party of the Regions - PPR (Partido Português das Regiões)

Right-wing
Democratic Party of the Atlantic - PDA (Partido Democrático do Atlântico)
Party of the Christian Democracy - PDC (Partido da Democracia Cristã)
Citizenship and Christian Democracy - PPV/CDC (Cidadania e Democracia Cristã)

Far-right
Democratic Movement of the Liberation of Portugal - MDLP (Movimento Democrático de Libertação de Portugal)
Independent Movement for the National Reconstruction / Party of the Portuguese Right - MIRN/PDP (Movimento Independente para a Reconstrução Nacional / Partido da Direita Portuguesa)

Historical parties

This list includes the defunct political parties that never reached the Third Republic, in chronological order.

Constitutional Monarchy (1834–1910)
Chartism (Cartismo)
Septemberism (Setembrismo)
Regenerator Party - PR (Partido Regenerador)
Historic Party - PH (Partido Histórico)
Reformist Party - PR (Partido Reformista)
Constituent Party - PC (Partido Constituinte)
Progressive Party - PP (Partido Progressista)
Portuguese Socialist Party - PSP (Partido Socialista Português)
Portuguese Republican Party - PRP (Partido Republicano Português)
Liberal Regenerator Party - PRL (Partido Regenerador Liberal)
Progressive Dissidence - DP (Dissidência Progressista)

First Republic (1910–1926)
Democratic Party (Partido Democrático)
Evolutionist Party - PRE (Partido Republicano Evolucionista)
Republican Union - PUR (Partido da União Republicana)
Lusitanian Integralism - IL (Integralismo Lusitano)
Monarchist Cause - CM (Causa Monárquica)
Catholic Centre Party - PCC (Partido do Centro Católico)
National Republican Party - PNR (Partido Nacional Republicano)
Republican Liberal Party - PLR (Partido Liberal Republicano)
Reconstitution Party - PRRN (Partido Republicano da Reconstituição Nacional)
Regionalist Party - PR (Partido Regionalista)
Nationalist Republican Party - PRN (Partido Republicano Nacionalista)
Democratic Leftwing Republican Party - PRED (Partido Republicano Esquerdista Democrático)
Union of Economic Interests - UIE (União dos Interesses Económicos)

Ditadura Nacional (1926–1933)
National Syndicalists - MNS (Movimento Nacional-Sindicalista)

Estado Novo (1933–1974)
Although the Estado Novo was a  dictatorship, with the National Union being legally the only party, the opposition was sometimes allowed to compete in (sham) elections; other parties were constituted underground or in exile. 
National Union - UN (União Nacional)
Movement of National Antifascist Unity - MUNAF (Movimento de Unidade Nacional Antifascista)
Movement of Democratic Unity - MUD (Movimento de Unidade Democrática)
Portuguese National Liberation Front - FPLP (Frente Portuguesa de Libertação Nacional)
Portuguese Socialist Action - ASP (Acção Socialista Portuguesa)

See also
 Politics of Portugal
 List of political parties by country

Notes

References

External links
 Portuguese Constitutional Court - current parties (in Portuguese)
 

Portugal
 
Political parties
Political parties
Portugal